La Pola is a Colombian drama telenovela based on historical facts and directed by Sergio Cabrera for RCN Televisión. The series tells the political and loving life of Policarpa Salavarrieta, a woman who became one of the most important figures in the history of the Independence of Colombia for preferring death instead of submission. The series originally aired from September 13, 2010, to July 27, 2011.

Plot 
The action of the telenovela is located in Viceroyalty of New Granada, early nineteenth century and the period of Colombian independence called Patria Boba, just before and after the cry of the Colombian Independence of the Spanish Empire on July 20, 1810, A strong crisis due to the French invasion by Napoleon. It was a time of definitions because it was realistic or patriotic. There is a struggle for the independence of the Spaniards and for trying to organize an army to defend the nascent country that is not yet called Colombia and freedom. A time of injustice.

Within this framework, a love story is woven between La Pola and Alejo Sabaraín. A story that has always attracted the attention of Colombians and historians. La Pola, a valiant and visionary woman, with libertarian ideals and equality; A woman advanced to those times where prevailing machismo and rigid social hierarchies prevent the female gender from having even a voice but La Pola is the opposite does not remain silent on anything that has to do with a macho order.

It is a time when love is still eternal and where a kiss means everything. La Pola will live a stormy, painful and passionate romance with Alejo Sabaraín, son of arribista and ambitious Spanish and a creole, a man prohibited for her in all aspects, for its ancestry, for being chapetón and also to belong to the armies of the Spanish Crown ; In short, a relationship that is seen as a sin and a transgression of the colonial order. But the attraction will be so strong that the couple will try to enjoy their love, no matter what the obstacle, whether it is death.

Cast

Main 
 Carolina Ramírez as Pola Salavarrieta
 Ana María Estupiñán as Young Pola Salavarrieta
 Emmanuel Esparza as Alejandro Sabbarain
 Pablo Espinosa as Young Alejandro Sabbarain
 Luis Fernando Hoyos as Antonio Nariño
 Valentina Rendón as Magdalena Ortega de Nariño
 Juliana Galvis as Maria Ignacia de Valencia
 Sebastián Martínez as Jorge Tadeo Lozano
 Andoni Ferreño as Francisco Javier Sabaraín y San Vicente
 Manuel Navarro as Juan Sámano 
 Zharick León as Catarina Salavarrieta
 Laura Torres as Young Catarina Salavarrieta
 José Sospedra as Leandro Sabaraín
 Joel Bosqued as Young Leandro Sabaraín
 Diego Trujillo as Domingo Garcia
 Marcela Agudelo as María Teresa Ramos de Sabaraín
 Héctor De Malba as Gaspar Alonso de Valencia
 María Elena Döehring as Eusebia Caicedo Santamaria de Valencia
 Luis Felipe Cortés as Juliano
 Ana Mosquera as Nicolasa 
 Ana María Arango as Gertrudis
 Kepa Amuchastegui as Gobernador Miguel Tacón
 Mariano Venancio as Virrey Antonio Amar y Borbón
 Ana Fernández as Doña Francisca Villanova y Marco

Recurring 
 Matilde Lemaitre as Young María Ignacia Valencia
 Greeicy Rendón as Sierva
 Carlos Humberto Camacho as Francisco José de Caldas
 Diego Cadavid as Ambrosio Almeida

References

External links 
 

2010 telenovelas
Colombian telenovelas
2010 Colombian television series debuts
2011 Colombian television series endings
2010s Colombian television series
Spanish-language telenovelas
Television shows set in Bogotá
Sony Pictures Television telenovelas